The Harbin Institute of Technology, Shenzhen (HITSZ) is a satellite campus of the Harbin Institute of Technology in Shenzhen, Guangdong, China.

Departments 
Nine departments and one institute comprise the HIT Shenzhen Graduate School offering master's and doctoral programs:
School of Computer Science and Technology
School of Electronic and Information Engineering
School of Mechanical Engineering and Automation
School of Civil and Environmental Engineering
School of Materials Science and Engineering
School of Architecture
School of Economics and Management
School of Sciences
School of Humanities and Social Sciences
The Institute of Space Science and Applied Technology

References

External links

Nanshan District, Shenzhen
Universities and colleges in Shenzhen
Educational institutions established in 2002
2002 establishments in China